Soo or SOO may refer to:

Places
 Sault Ste. Marie, Ontario, a border city in Canada nicknamed "The Soo"
 Sault Ste. Marie, Michigan, a border city in the United States also nicknamed "The Soo"
 Soo Locks, the locks between Lake Superior and the lower Great Lakes
 Soo Township, Michigan, United States
 Soo, Kagoshima, a city in Japan
 Soo District, Kagoshima, a district in Japan
Sóo, a village in the Canary Islands
Søo, a river in Norway
 Soo River, a tributary of the Green River in British Columbia, Canada
 Strood railway station, Kent, England (National Rail station code)

People
 Su (surname), a Chinese surname also spelled "Soo"
 Soo (Korean name), a Korean surname and given name
 Jack Soo (1917–1979; born Goro Suzuki), Japanese-American actor
 Janar Soo (born 1991), Estonian basketball player
 Phillipa Soo (born 1990), American actress
 Rezső Soó (1903–1980), Hungarian botanist
 "Soo", nickname of William Sousa Bridgeforth (1907–2004), American Black league baseball team owner

Other
 Soo language, the Kuliak language of the Tepes people of northeastern Uganda
 Soo (film), a 2007 South Korean film
 Soo (puppet), a British panda puppet and TV character
 Rugby League State of Origin (SOO), an Australian rugby league competition
 Soldiers of Odin (SOO), a street patrol group
 Soo Line (disambiguation), several railroads

See also
Sioux, a Native American and First Nations people in North America
Sioux (disambiguation)
Sault (disambiguation)
Sue (disambiguation)
Su (disambiguation)